Professor Christopher T. Chantler is an Australian physicist, currently at University of Melbourne and an Elected Fellow of the American Physical Society who has had works published in the Journal of Physical and Chemical Reference Data, the Journal of Organometallic Chemistry and the X-Ray Spectrometry.

Societies, committees and institutes 
Chantler is a member of the:

 American Physical Society (2016-)
 American Chemical Society (2010-) 
 Optical Society of America (1993-)
 American Institute of Physics (1993-)
 Australian Optical Society (1994-)
 Institute of Physics (UK) (2004-)
 Society of Crystallographers in Australia and New Zealand (1999-)
 International Radiation Physics Society (1999-)
 International Scientific Advisory Committee, XVUV (2008-)
 International X-ray Absorption Fine Structure Society (2006-)
 Australian X-ray Analytical Association (2006-)
 Legend (2019-)

Career 
Chantler is an Associate Editor at the Australian Optical Society News and has been since 1995. He used to be a councilor and director of the Australian Optical Society (AOS) 1996–2007.
He has also been a website coordinator at AOS since 2000; and maintains his status as a certified mad dog as of 2019.

References

Fellows of the American Physical Society
Australian physicists
Academic staff of the University of Melbourne
Living people
Year of birth missing (living people)